Ronda de la Comunicación is a station on Line 10 of the Madrid Metro. It is located in fare Zone A. It is the station that serves the Distrito Telefónica office park housing the headquarters of Telefónica, S.A.

References 

Line 10 (Madrid Metro) stations
Railway stations in Spain opened in 2007
Buildings and structures in Fuencarral-El Pardo District, Madrid